This is a list of fatal dog attacks in Canada. A 2008 study found that one to two deaths per year in Canada are attributable to dog attacks, however other systematic data is lacking compared to the wider variety of studies conducted by researchers in the United States. In the lists below, the attribution of breed is assigned by the sources.

Fatalities before 2000

Prior to 1990

Fatalities in 1990-1999

Fatalities after 2000

Fatalities in 2000-2009

Fatalities in 2010-2019

Fatalities in 2020-2022

See also 
 Animal attack
 Wolf attacks on humans
 List of wolf attacks
 Coyote attacks on humans
 Animal attacks
 Beware of the dog

Other species:
 List of fatal bear attacks in North America
 List of fatal cougar attacks in North America

References

Canada
Dogs in Canada
Canid attacks